Mishka Mojabber Mourani, née Marie Christine Mojabber (born 1953) is a Lebanese poet.

Mishka Mojabber Mourani was born in Alexandria, the second daughter of a Greek mother and Lebanese-Syrian Christian father. The family moved to Beirut when she was ten. A little later they emigrated to Sydney, Australia, where she completed high school and entered Sydney University. She completed a BA and MA in English Literature at the American University of Beirut. She spent most of the Lebanese Civil War in Beirut, teaching English and working as an educational consultant.

Work
 Lest We Forget 1975-1990, 1991
 'The Fragrant Garden', in Roseanne Saad Khalaf, ed., Hikayat: Short Stories by Lebanese Women, 2006
 Balconies: A Mediterranean Memoir, 2009
 (with Aida Y. Haddad Alone Together, 2012

References

1953 births
Living people
20th-century Lebanese poets
Lebanese women poets
Greek women poets
Lebanese people of Greek descent
Lebanese emigrants to Australia
Greek emigrants to Australia
21st-century Lebanese poets
21st-century Greek poets
Greek Orthodox Christians from Lebanon
Eastern Orthodox Christians from Lebanon